Air Command is the only Command currently active in the Royal Air Force. It was formed by the merger of Royal Air Force Strike and Personnel and Training commands on 1 April 2007, and has its headquarters at RAF High Wycombe, Buckinghamshire. 

The equivalent in the Royal Navy is Navy Command Headquarters at Portsmouth and the equivalent in the British Army is Army Headquarters at Andover.

Command structure
Air Command is commanded by the Chief of the Air Staff. Formerly, it was under a four-star Air Chief Marshal, Commander-in-Chief, Air Command, but this structure was discontinued due to the 2011 Levine Report. 

There are two Deputy Commanders of Air Marshal rank. The Deputy Commander Operations has responsibility for the two Groups inherited from Strike Command (No. 1 Group and No. 2 Group) and also No. 38 Group which brings together the RAF’s expeditionary engineering, logistics, and communications units, Medical Operations units, and RAF Music Services. The Deputy Commander Operations also has responsibility for the Group inherited from Personnel and Training Command, No. 22 (Training) Group. In November 2018, No. 11 Group was further formed as part of RAF Command. The Deputy Commander Operations acts as the Deputy to the CAS and oversees day-to-day operations  The Deputy Commander Capability commands Chief of Staff Personnel or Air Secretary, Chief of Staff Capability, RAF Chaplain-in-Chief, Director Legal Services and Head RAF Medical Services.

Commanders-in-Chief (post discontinued in Spring 2012)
Air Chief Marshal Sir Clive Loader KCB OBE, 30 March 2007 – 2 April 2009 (appointed as C-in-C Strike Command)
Air Chief Marshal Sir Christopher Moran KCB OBE MVO, 3 April 2009 – 26 May 2010 (Died in office)
Air Chief Marshal Sir Simon Bryant KCB CBE, 18 June 2010 to March 2012

See also

 List of Royal Air Force commands

References

External links
 RAF Air Command

News items
 Royal Air Force Web Site - Official Announcement of Formation of RAF Air Command

|-

 

High Wycombe
Military units and formations established in 2007
Organisations based in Buckinghamshire
Air Command
2007 establishments in the United Kingdom
Military headquarters in the United Kingdom
UK